Jobber may refer to:

Athletics
 Job (professional wrestling) - A professional wrestler who routinely loses a match.
 Wichita Jobbers, a minor league baseball team in the Western Association from 1905 to 1911

Commerce
 A person or corporation that engages in job production
 One who performs odd jobs or piece work
 Jobber (merchandising), mass merchandising distributor of goods to retailers
 Jobbing house or jobber, a type of wholesale business
 Jobber (fuel), a middleman in the fuel industry
 Stockjobber, a dealer in financial securities
 A retailer, particularly within the automobile industry
 Rack jobber

People
 John McGrath (Westmeath hurler) (1928–1980), Irish hurler nicknamed "Jobber"

Places
 Jobbers Canyon Historic District

Publishing
 Jobbing press or jobber, a type of printing press

Tools and equipment
 Jobber, a length of drill bit; see drill bit sizes
 Jobber chairs; see Charles Dillon (designer)

See also
 Job (disambiguation)
 Jobbing (disambiguation)